Shirley Yeung Sze-ki (born 7 August 1978), is a Hong Kong actress who was under contract with TVB from 2001 to 2014. Yeung is a Hakka of Jiaoling descent.

Career 
She was the winner of the 2001 Miss Hong Kong Pageant contest. She had been the favourite among audiences since the very beginning of the competition. She won six awards and she currently holds the record for the most awards won by Miss Hong Kong. Yeung participated in Miss Chinese International 2002, where she made the top 5. Yeung began her career with TVB short afterwards. Her first drama was The Threat of Love 2, playing the third female lead, where she played different characters for each episode. She went on to play significant roles in dramas throughout the 2000s including Angels of Mission and Always Ready.

She left TVB in 2014 and expanded her career to Mainland China.

Personal life 
Shirley met actor Gregory Lee in 2002 on the set of Blade Heart. They dated until 2011 when Yeung announced their break-up at a public event. Shortly after the break-up, she dated Andy Ng which lasted 3 months. In 2012, her private life came under media scrutiny after she chose not to reveal the identity of her daughter's father to the public after Yeung announced on Weibo that she had given birth to daughter, Krystal, who takes her surname, Yeung.

Education
 Maryknoll Fathers' School
 Hong Kong Institute of Education

Filmography

TV series

Movies
Kung Fung Mahjong 3 (2007)
Black Comedy (2014)
The Bat Night (2014)
Adieu (2018)
Top Female Force (2019)

TV Hosts

Discography 
 The Bitter Bitten theme-song. – "Only Need You"

References

External links
 Shirley Yeung's page at TVB

  SZEKI.ORG Official Shirley Yeung Website
 

|-

TVB actors
1978 births
Living people
Alumni of the Education University of Hong Kong
21st-century Hong Kong women singers
Hong Kong film actresses
Hong Kong Mandopop singers
Hong Kong female models
Hong Kong people of Hakka descent
People from Jiaoling
Hong Kong television actresses
Hong Kong television presenters
Hong Kong women television presenters
Miss Hong Kong winners
21st-century Hong Kong actresses
Hakka musicians